William B. Lawsha, better known as Prince Lasha, (September 10, 1929 – December 12, 2008) was an American jazz alto saxophonist, baritone saxophonist, flautist, clarinetist and English horn player.

Life and career

He was born in Fort Worth, Texas, where he came of age studying and performing alongside fellow I.M. Terrell High School students John Carter, Ornette Coleman, King Curtis, Charles Moffett, and Dewey Redman.

Lasha moved to California during the 1950s. In the 1960s, he was active in the burgeoning free jazz movement, of which his Fort Worth cohort Ornette Coleman was a pioneer. Lasha recorded with Eric Dolphy (Iron Man and Conversations, both in 1963) and the Elvin Jones/Jimmy Garrison Sextet featuring McCoy Tyner (Illumination!, also in 1963).

Lasha moved to Europe and in 1966 was based in Kensington, London, The album Insight (1966) by the Prince Lasha Ensemble was recorded in England and featured local musicians, including Bruce Cale, Dave Willis, Jeff Clyne, Rick Laird, Joe Oliver (drums), David Snell (harp), Mike Carr, Stan Tracey, John Mumford (trombone) and Chris Bateson (trumpet).

Returning to the US in 1967, Lasha worked closely with saxophonist Sonny Simmons, with whom he recorded two albums, The Cry! (1962) and Firebirds (1967), for Contemporary Records. The latter album received five stars and an AMG Albumpick at Allmusic.

In the 1970s, Lasha and Simmons made additional recordings under the name Firebirds. In 2005, Lasha recorded the album The Mystery of Prince Lasha with the Odean Pope Trio. Lasha died on December 12, 2008, in Oakland, California.

Discography

As leader
 The Cry! (Contemporary, 1962) with Sonny Simmons
 Inside Story (Enja 3073, 1965 [1981])
 Insight (CBS SBPG 62409, 1966)
 Firebirds (Contemporary, 1967) with Sonny Simmons
 Firebirds, Live at the Berkeley Jazz Festival Vol. 1 (Birdseye series 99001, 1974)
 Firebirds, Live at the Berkeley Jazz Festival Vol. 2 (Birdseye series 99001, 1974) (also released as Search for Tomorrow (Enja 4008, 1982))
 Firebirds, And Now Music (daagnimRecords LP09, 1983) with Dennis Gonzalez / Webster Armstrong
 The Mystery of Prince Lasha with the Odean Pope Trio - CIMP, 2005

As sideman
With Gene Ammons
Brasswind (Prestige, 1974)
With Eric Dolphy
 Iron Man (1963)
 Conversations (1963)
With Elvin Jones / Jimmy Garrison
 Illumination! (1963)
With Michael White
The Land of Spirit and Light (Impulse!, 1973)With Dennis Gonzalez' 
 Witness'' (daagnim Records LP08, 1983)

References 

1929 births
2008 deaths
20th-century American male musicians
20th-century clarinetists
20th-century American saxophonists
American expatriates in England
American jazz alto saxophonists
American jazz clarinetists
American jazz flautists
American male saxophonists
Contemporary Records artists
Enja Records artists
Jazz musicians from Texas
American male jazz musicians
People from Fort Worth, Texas
20th-century flautists